The Jean Minjoz Hospital is a large hospital in Besançon in the French region of Bourgogne-Franche-Comté.  It is located in Planoise in the west of the city.

History 
The hospital was built in 1980s near Rue de Dole, one of the city's main arteries, and includes a heliport.  It was named after a former mayor of Besançon, Jean Minjoz (1904–1987) and was opened in 1983.

References

External links 
 Photographic site 

Teaching hospitals in France
Hospital buildings completed in 1983
Buildings and structures in Besançon
Planoise
Hospitals in Doubs
Hospitals established in 1983